Bangana zhui is a species of cyprinid fish endemic to China.

References

Bangana
Fish described in 1989